The following are some of the industries in Cherthala, Kerala, India.

Industries

Coir
Coir is the traditional and most popular industrial produce in Cherthala. Coir industry is run under both private and cooperative sector. A politically well-organised coir workers and availability of raw coir fibre are the basic resources of coir industry in Cherthala. The big export housed have mechanised their plants with latest hi-tech automated coir looms. They weave out tons of coir carpets, door mats and jute items every month both for exports. One can find exquisitely designed carpets and mats displayed in the showrooms along the NH 66. Some of the major coir mat manufacturers and exporters in Cherthala are TRAVANCORE COCOTUFT (P) Ltd, Travancore Mats & Matting (P) Ltd ( established 1917)  Group -Chertala, Extra Weave ( P) Ltd, Wilton Weber’s ( P) Ltd, REACH MATS, COCONEYTH, Deco Mats, Koncherry Coir Exporters, Maithara Coir house, Lords Exports, Mayithara Home Decors, Loomcraft, Charangattu, Sherthallai, MC MILLS, Kalavamkodam, Kuncharath Viva carpets, Panavally, Joece Enterprises, Coir Mills, CoirFlex.

Seafood export

The coastal inland area of Cherthala is closely interlocked with the Kerala backwaters and Vembanad lake. This eco-system is utilized for large-scale prawn and shrimp farming as an alternative in the low-lying paddy fields. Secondly the Cochin fishing harbour and port is just 15 km away from Aroor. The abundance of marine wealth and logistical advantages has helped the seafood export to grow especially around Aroor, Chandiroor, Ezhupunna, Thuravoor, Arookutty. Shrimp, squid, Cuttle fish and other fin fishes are some of the raw marine wealth processed and exported. There are many marine food processing units in these places which provide employment to large number of people.  The raw seafood catch is also purchased by large seafood export firms from North Kerala, Kollam, South Karnataka, Odisha, Tamil Nadu etc., processed and preserved in cold storages and then trans-shipped through Cochin port.

Heavy engineering
SILK (Steel Industries Limited Kerala) - Maithara and Thuravoor. Proposed Indian Railways coach factory of will be coming up at Maithara.

Brewery
United Spirits Ltd (Mc-Dowell distillery), established by the UB Group, is a major industry in the town and it is established on the bank of Vembanadu lake in Varanadu, Cherthala. United Breweries Ltd, Varanad manufactures Beer in the brand name Kingfisher.

Industrial area
The industrial areas at Aroor and Maithara have many small/medium scale industrial units. The Kerala State Electronics Development Corporation Limited KELTRON has a control and instrumentation division running in Aroor.

IT Park
An IT Info park complex and associated township is coming up near Pallippuram, 8 km North of Cherthala Town.

IGC Pallipuram
The Industril area called INDUSTRIAL GROWTH CENTER PALLIPURAM  A and the associated with KSIDC township is coming up near Pallippuram, 9 km North of Cherthala Town.

References

Economy of Alappuzha district